Nettastomatidae, the duckbill eels or witch eels are a family of eels. The name is from Greek netta meaning "duck" and stoma meaning "mouth".

Duckbill eels are found along the continental slopes of tropical and temperate oceans worldwide. They are bottom-dwelling fish, feeding on invertebrates and smaller fish. Most species lack pectoral fins.

Species
About 40 species are placed in seven genera:
 Genus Facciolella
 Genus Hoplunnis
 Genus "Leptocephalus"
 Genus Nettastoma
 Genus Nettenchelys
 Genus Saurenchelys
 Genus Venefica

References

 

 
Fish of the Atlantic Ocean
Fish of the Pacific Ocean
Fish of the Indian Ocean
Ray-finned fish families